The 6551 Asynchronous Communications Interface Adapter (ACIA) was an integrated circuit made by MOS Technology. It served as a companion UART chip for the widely popular 6502 microprocessor. Intended to implement RS-232, its specifications called for a maximum speed of 19,200 bits per second with its onboard baud-rate generator, or 125kbit/s using an external 16x clock.

The 6551 was used in several computers of the 1970s and 1980s, including the Commodore PET and Commodore Plus/4. It was also used by Apple Computer on the Super Serial Card for their Apple II series, and by Radio Shack on the Deluxe RS-232 Program Pak for their Color Computer.

Commodore International omitted the 6551 from the popular VIC-20, C64, and C128 home computers. Instead, these systems implemented a bit-banging UART via KERNAL routines. This RS-232 implementation was not reliable over 1200 bit/s (see errata comments in the 6526 article), forcing some programmers of terminal programs to write carefully calibrated custom serial routines. The popular terminal program NovaTerm was able to achieve 4800 bit/s on the C64, and DesTerm achieved 9600 bit/s on the C128. Several other terminal programs achieved 2400 bit/s.  Novaterm 9.6 on a Commodore 64 or 128 can achieve a maximum rate of 9600 bit/s on the user port, using an EZ-232 interface, designed by Jim Brain.

Several companies, including Dr. Evil Labs and Creative Micro Designs, marketed an add-on cartridge containing a 6551 and an industry-standard RS-232 port to allow the C64 and 128 to use high-speed modems from companies such as U.S. Robotics and Hayes Communications. The Dr. Evil and CMD cartridges pushed the 6551 to 38,400 baud and, with a faster-still clock crystal, some end users reported getting 115,200 bit/s from the 6551. The ADTPro file transfer program disables the baud rate generator in the 6551, allowing 115,200 bit/s transfers with an unmodified clock crystal.

Variants 
The Rockwell 65C52 combines two CMOS 6551s on a chip.

Similar chips 
The Motorola 6850 is a similar chip to the MOS Technology 6551. The 6850 is often used for MIDI.

The Western Design Center WDC 65C51 is designed as a drop in replacement for the original MOS 6551, electrically, physically and programming- compatible with most 6551 and 6850 derivatives from most other suppliers.

External links
 Datasheet

MOS Technology integrated circuits
Input/output integrated circuits